The 1964 London local elections were held on 7 May 1964. They were the inaugural elections for the thirty-two London boroughs, which were created on 1 April 1965 by the London Government Act 1963. All seats were up for election, with polling stations open between 08:00 and 21:00.

The result was a landslide for the Labour Party, who won twenty of the boroughs. The Conservatives won nine, and three were under no overall control. Only sixteen Liberal councillors were elected in London, along with forty-nine residents and ratepayers candidates, three independents and three Communists. The result followed the convincing Labour gain of the new Greater London Council in the first GLC elections which had been held on 9 April.

Until 1978, each council had aldermen, in the ratio of one aldermen to six councillors. Following the elections, each council elected all of its aldermen, half of which served until 1968 and half until 1971. This did not affect political control in any borough.

Council results
Summary of council election results:

Overall councillor numbers

References
 Greater London Assembly – London Borough Council Elections 2006
 

 
London local elections
1964